Edward Domenic Re (October 14, 1920 – September 17, 2006) was a judge of the United States Court of International Trade.

Education and career

Born on October 14, 1920, in Santa Marina Salina, Italy, Re received a Bachelor of Science degree in 1941 from the School of Commerce at St. John's University in New York City, New York and a Bachelor of Laws in 1943 from St. John's University School of Law. He serve as a United States Air Force lieutenant from 1943 to 1947. He received a Doctor of Juridical Science in 1950 from New York University School of Law. He was a faculty member at St. John's University School of Law from 1947 to 2004, as a professor of law from 1947 to 1969, as an adjunct professor of law from 1969 to 1980 and again as a professor of law from 1980 to 2004. He was a professor of law at Pratt Institute from 1947 to 1948. He was a hearing officer with the United States Department of Justice from 1958 to 1969. He was a member of the New York City Board of Higher Education (now City University of New York) from 1958 to 1969. He was Chairman of the Foreign Claims Settlement Commission at the United States Department of Justice from 1961 to 1968. He was a Visiting Professor of Law at Georgetown University from 1962 to 1967. He was the Assistant Secretary of State for Educational and Cultural Affairs at the United States Department of State from 1968 to 1969. He was an adjunct and visiting professor of law at New York Law School from 1972 to 1990.

Federal judicial service

Re was nominated by President Lyndon B. Johnson on September 12, 1968, to a seat on the United States Customs Court vacated by Lindley Beckworth. He was confirmed by the United States Senate on October 2, 1968, and received his commission on October 4, 1968. He served as Chief Judge from 1977 to 1980. He was reassigned by operation of law to the United States Court of International Trade on November 1, 1980, to a new seat authorized by 94 Stat. 1727. He served as Chief Judge from 1980 to 1991. 

Re was a fierce critic of Richard Serra's sculpture, Tilted Arc, which had been installed on Foley Square outside his courthouse,, and advocated for its removal.  Re was a member of the Judicial Conference of the United States from 1990 to 1991. Judge Re's service terminated on April 30, 1991, due to his retirement. He died on September 17, 2006, in New York City.

References

Sources
 
 The Italian American Experience: An Encyclopedia (Garland Publishing, 2000), p. 535
 "Deaths: Re, Judge Edward D.", New York Times, Nov. 19, 2006

1920 births
2006 deaths
Georgetown University Law Center faculty
Judges of the United States Court of International Trade
Judges of the United States Customs Court
New York Law School faculty
Pratt Institute faculty
St. John's University (New York City) faculty
St. John's University School of Law alumni
United States Air Force officers
United States Assistant Secretaries of State
United States Department of Justice officials
United States federal judges appointed by Lyndon B. Johnson
20th-century American judges